Wilson Raynor (born March 29, 1986) is a former American football long snapper. He was signed by the New York Jets  after the 2011 NFL lockout. He played four years of college football at East Carolina University.

References

Living people
1986 births
People from Dunn, North Carolina
American football long snappers
East Carolina Pirates football players
New York Jets players